Canistropsis pulcherrima is a species of flowering plant in the genus Canistropsis.

This bromeliad is endemic to the Atlantic Forest biome (Mata Atlantica Brasileira) within Rio de Janeiro (state), located in southeastern Brazil.

References

pulcherrima
Endemic flora of Brazil
Flora of Rio de Janeiro (state)
Flora of the Atlantic Forest